Unified Cornish (UC) (Kernewek Uny[e]s, KU) is a variety of the Cornish language of the Cornish revival. Developed gradually by Robert Morton Nance during and before the 1930s, it derived its name from its standardisation of the variant spellings of traditional Cornish manuscripts. Nance's recommended spelling and grammar, based on Middle Cornish, soon supplanted Henry Jenner's system, which had been based largely on Late Cornish. Most of the older generation of Cornish users alive today would have started under this system. It was also the form originally used by Gorsedh Kernow, although they now use the new Standard Written Form.

Criticism
In the 1980s, Unified Cornish came under heavy criticism, leading to the creation of Kernewek Kemmyn (KK) and Modern Cornish (also called, Revived Late Cornish, "RLC"). Some Cornish speakers continued to employ Unified Cornish nonetheless.

Unified Cornish, Revised
In the 1990s, yet another variety emerged when Unified Cornish Revised (UCR) ("KUA") was devised by Nicholas Williams.

Agan Tavas

In September 2008 Agan Tavas reaffirmed its support for Unified Cornish, as well as for the SWF and for Kernowek Standard.

See also

Agan Tavas
Cussel an Tavas Kernuak
Kernowek Standard

References

External links
English-Cornish Dictionary (Gerlyver Sawsnek-Kernowek) by Nicholas Williams
Cussel an Tavas Kernuack
Agan Tavas

Cornish language revival
Cornish nationalism